Robert S. Capers (born July 15, 1949) is an American journalist.

Capers won the 1992 Pulitzer Prize for Explanatory Reporting with Eric Lipton for a series about the Hubble Space Telescope that illustrated many of the problems with America's space program.  He worked at the Hartford Courant until 1995.

References

Colby College alumni
1949 births
Living people
Pulitzer Prize for Explanatory Journalism winners
20th-century American journalists
American male journalists